Hovatn or Hovatnet is a lake in the municipality of Bygland in Agder county, Norway.  It is part of the Otra river drainage basin.  The  lake is regulated and is used by the nearby Hovatn hydroelectric power plant.  The dam has an outlet into the Hovassåni river which empties into the Åraksfjorden near Åraksbø.

Hovatn is located in the Otra watershed, but only  to the east is the lake Topsæ which is in the Tovdalselva drainage basin.

See also
List of lakes in Aust-Agder
List of lakes in Norway

References

Lakes of Agder
Setesdal
Bygland
Reservoirs in Norway